{{DISPLAYTITLE:C6H10N2O4}}
The molecular formula C6H10N2O4 may refer to:

 Diethyl azodicarboxylate
 Formiminoglutamic acid

Molecular formulas